Gatesclarkeana erotias is a moth of the family Tortricidae first described by Edward Meyrick in 1905. It is found in India, Sri Lanka, Timor and Thailand.

Larval food plants are Averrhoa carambola, Bauhinia purpurea, Bauhinia tomentosa, Lantana camara, Loranthus, Mallotus repandus, Mangifera indica and Sapindus mukorossi.

References

Moths of Asia
Moths described in 1905